Heighway is a surname. Notable persons with the surname include:
Freida Ruth Heighway, (1907–1963), Australian gynaecologist
Geoffrey Heighway, inventor of the micromodel concept of card model or paper model
John Heighway, NASA physicist and investigator of Heighway dragon
Steve Heighway (born 1947), former footballer
Victoria Heighway, New Zealand rugby union player who beat out Kelly Brazier for the 2009 Steinlager Rugby Awards as NZRU Women's Player of the Year

See also
Highway (disambiguation), including some people with that surname